Kenneth Alan Stone (born October 8, 1982) is an American mixed martial artist. A professional MMA competitor since 2007, Stone had fought mostly in regional promotions on the east coast, before signing with Zuffa.

Career

Background
Stone wrestled collegiately at Bridgewater State University from 2001-2004.  He began training in mixed martial arts in 2006 and turned professional the following year.
He was an assistant coach for Holliston High Wrestling team from 2005-2007.

Amateur career
Six years before turning professional, Stone debuted in amateur MMA on August 24, 2001, facing Jeff Malki at Extreme Grappling Challenge 4. He won via submission, and would then take a long hiatus before making his professional debut in 2007.

Early career
Stone started his professional mixed martial arts career on the regional circuit winning his first eight professional bouts, finishing all of his opponents, before dropping a five-round split decision loss to Jason McLean, during which he suffered a broken foot in the second round. After fighting McLean, Ken made a decision to move down from featherweight to bantamweight weight class division.

World Extreme Cagefighting
In October 2010 Stone signed with World Extreme Cagefighting.

Stone made his promotional debut against Eddie Wineland on November 11, 2010 at WEC 53, losing via KO (slam) in the first round.

Ultimate Fighting Championship

In October 2010, World Extreme Cagefighting merged with the Ultimate Fighting Championship. As part of the merger, all WEC fighters were transferred to the UFC.

Stone faced Scott Jorgensen on June 4, 2011 at The Ultimate Fighter 13 Finale. Stone was arguably winning the first round until he was knocked unconscious from his guard.

Stone fought Donny Walker on September 17, 2011 at UFC Fight Night 25. He won the fight via technical submission (rear naked choke) in the first round, earning his first UFC victory.

Stone was expected to face Mike Easton on January 20, 2012 at UFC on FX 1, but pulled out due to an injury.

Stone was expected to face Edwin Figueroa on June 22, 2012 at UFC on FX 4.  However, Figueroa was forced out of the bout with an injury and replaced by Francisco Rivera. However, Rivera pulled out of the bout due to an injury and was replaced by Dustin Pague. Stone defeated Pague via split decision.

Stone next faced Érik Pérez on August 11, 2012 at UFC 150. He lost the fight via TKO in the first round, and was subsequently released from the promotion shortly after.

Championships and accomplishments
American Fighting Organization
AFO Featherweight Championship (One time)

Mixed martial arts record

|- 
| Loss
|align=center| 11–4
| Érik Pérez
| KO (punches)
| UFC 150
| 
|align=center| 1
|align=center| 0:17
|Denver, Colorado, United States
|
|-
| Win
|align=center| 11–3
| Dustin Pague
| Decision (split)
| UFC on FX: Maynard vs. Guida
| 
|align=center| 3
|align=center| 5:00
|Atlantic City, New Jersey, United States
|
|-
| Win
|align=center| 10–3
| Donny Walker
| Technical Submission (rear-naked choke) 
| UFC Fight Night: Shields vs. Ellenberger
| 
|align=center| 1
|align=center| 2:40
|New Orleans, Louisiana, United States
|
|-
| Loss
|align=center| 9–3
| Scott Jorgensen
| KO (punches)
| The Ultimate Fighter 13 Finale
| 
|align=center| 1
|align=center| 4:01
|Las Vegas, Nevada, United States
| 
|-
| Loss
|align=center| 9–2
| Eddie Wineland
| KO (slam)
| WEC 53
| 
|align=center| 1
|align=center| 2:11
|Glendale, Arizona, United States
| 
|-
| Win
|align=center| 9–1
| Jason Bennett
| Submission (guillotine choke)
| AFO: Halloween Havoc 2
| 
|align=center| 1
|align=center| 2:37
|Mansfield, Massachusetts, United States
| 
|-
| Loss
|align=center| 8–1
| Jason McLean
| Decision (split)
| AFO: Summer Bash
| 
|align=center| 5
|align=center| 5:00
|Braintree, Massachusetts, United States
| 
|-
| Win
|align=center| 8–0
| Eddie Felix
| Submission (rear-naked choke)
| AFO: Night of Champions
| 
|align=center| 1
|align=center| 1:54
|Braintree, Massachusetts, United States
| 
|-
| Win
|align=center| 7–0
| Nam Nguyen
| TKO (punches)
| AFO: New Year's Redemption
| 
|align=center| 1
|align=center| 3:30
|Braintree, Massachusetts, United States
| 
|-
| Win
|align=center| 6–0
| Chris Simmons
| Submission (guillotine choke)
| United States Fight League: War in the Woods 4
| 
|align=center| 2
|align=center| 1:30
|Ledyard, Connecticut, United States
| 
|-
| Win
|align=center| 5–0
| Ethan Kean
| TKO (punches)
| World Championship Fighting 3
| 
|align=center| 1
|align=center| 0:33
|Wilmington, Massachusetts, United States
| 
|-
| Win
|align=center| 4–0
| Joe Camacho
| TKO (punches)
| Battle Cage Xtreme 4
| 
|align=center| 1
|align=center| 2:51
|Atlantic City, New Jersey, United States
| 
|-
| Win
|align=center| 3–0
| Daniel Duarte
| Submission (rear-naked choke)
| World Championship Fighting 2
| 
|align=center| 1
|align=center| 1:46
|Wilmington, Massachusetts, United States
| 
|-
| Win
|align=center| 2–0
| Ben Manseau
| Submission (guillotine choke)
| CZ 24: Renaissance
| 
|align=center| 1
|align=center| 0:30
|Revere, Massachusetts, United States
| 
|-
| Win
|align=center| 1–0
| Josh Spearman
| TKO (punches)
| WFL 18: Calloway Cup 6
| 
|align=center| 1
|align=center| 1:54
|Revere, Massachusetts, United States
|

Amateur mixed martial arts record

|-
|Win
|align=center| 1–0
|Jeff Malki
|Submission 
|EGC - Extreme Grappling Challenge 4
|
|align=center| 1
|align=center| 2:30
|Revere, Massachusetts, United States
|

References

External links
Official UFC Profile

American male mixed martial artists
Bantamweight mixed martial artists
Mixed martial artists utilizing collegiate wrestling
Mixed martial artists from Massachusetts
American male sport wrestlers
Amateur wrestlers
People from Holliston, Massachusetts
Sportspeople from Middlesex County, Massachusetts
Living people
1982 births
Mixed martial artists from Florida
People from Coconut Creek, Florida
Sportspeople from the Miami metropolitan area
Ultimate Fighting Championship male fighters
Bridgewater State Bears athletes